SESH (Social Entrepreneurship to Spur Health; Chinese: 赛思项目) is a partnership between Southern Medical University Dermatology Hospital and the University of North Carolina Project-China that uses crowdsourcing to improve health. In China, the team lead the “Sex + Health” image crowdsourcing contest, a condom contest, crowdsourcing for patterns for HIV testing and referrals, and  the "HepTestContest,” a global hepatitis testing contest. Together with the World Health Organization, SESH helped develop the HepTestContest. The purpose was to identify and evaluate Hepatitis B/C testing projects throughout the world. They also organized the "Healthy Cities Contest" and helped to advise on "2BeatHIV."

Research

Crowdsourcing & Social Entrepreneurship
Crowdsourcing HIV Test Promotion Videos: A Non-Inferiority Randomized Controlled Trial in China.《众包HIV检测视频：一项中国的非劣效性随机分配对照试验》
Crowdsourcing health communication about condom use in men who have sex with men in China: a randomised controlled trial.《众包关于中国男男性行为中保险套使用的健康交流：*一项随机对照实验》
Organizational characteristics of HIV/syphilis testing services for men who have sex with men in South China: a social entrepreneurship analysis and implications for creating sustainable service models.《为中国南方男男性行为者提供的HIV/梅毒检测服务中的组织特性：对监理可持续服务模式的社会企业与影响分析》
Creative Contributory Contests to Spur Innovation in Sexual Health: 2 Cases and a Guide for Implementation.《用创意征集比赛来促进性健康创新：2个个案及执行指引》
Innovation contests to promote sexual health in china: a qualitative evaluation.《为中国推广性健康的创新型比赛：一个定性评估》 
Acceptability and feasibility of a social entrepreneurship testing model to promote HIV self-testing and linkage to care among men who have sex with men.《社会企业模型对促进MSM群体HIV自我检测及级联关怀的可接受性及可行性评估》

Men Who Have Sex With Men (MSM)
A Mixed-Methods Study on the Acceptability of Using eHealth for HIV Prevention and Sexual Health Care Among Men Who Have Sex With Men in China.《对中国男男性行为者HIV预防和性健康护理的电子健康使用接受性的混合方法研究》
Gay Apps for Seeking Sex Partners in China: Implications for MSM Sexual Health《中国的同志寻性手机应用：对MSM性健康的影响》
Intimate Partner Violence and Correlates with Risk Behaviors and HIV/STI Diagnoses Among Men Who Have Sex With Men and Men Who Have Sex with Men and Women in China: A Hidden Epidemic.《对中国男男性行为者和双性性行为这亲密伴侣暴力与高危行为和HIV/STI诊断的相关分析：隐藏的瘟疫》

HIV Detection
HIV self-testing among key populations: an implementation science approach to evaluating self-testing.《关键人群中的HIV自我检测：评估自我检测的科学执行方法》
HIV and syphilis testing preferences among men who have sex with men in South China: a qualitative analysis to inform sexual health services.《中国南方男男性行为者的HIV和梅毒检测偏好：对性健康服务的定性分析》
Strategies for promoting HIV testing uptake: willingness to receive couple-based and collective HIV testing among a cross-sectional online sample of men who have sex with men in China.《推广HIV检测策略：中国男男性行为者在线横截面样本中的接受以伴侣为基和集体HIV检测意愿》
HIV self-testing among online MSM in China: implications for expanding HIV testing among key populations.《中国网络MSM人群的HIV自我检测：在关键人群中扩展HIV检测的影响》
Sexual Behaviors and HIV/Syphilis Testing Among Transgender Individuals in China: Implications for Expanding HIV Testing Services.《中国变性人的性行为与HIV/梅毒检测：扩展HIV检测服务的影响》

External links
Official Website

References

Partnerships
Crowdsourcing